Anne Sophia-Marie van Aaken (born 19 April 1969 in Bonn, West Germany) is a German lawyer and economist, who is a full professor of law and economics, legal theory, public international law and European law at the University of Hamburg.

Life
Van Aaken completed her Abitur in Bonn. From 1987 to 1992 she studied economics with the degree of Lic. pole. and communication sciences with the degree dipl. journ. at the University of Friborg and then from 1992 to 1997 law at the Ludwig Maximilian University of Munich. There she graduated in 1997 with a first state examination First Juristische Staatsexamen. Van Aaken was a visiting scholar at the University of California, Berkeley, and Yale University in 1997 and 1998. At the University of Frankfurt an der Oder, van Aaken was promoted Doctor of Law Dr. iur. (Doctor iuris) with the Dissertation, Rational Choice in Law. On the value of economic theory in law. She graduated from the Second Legal State Exam in 2002 and since 2003 she has been admitted to the bar in Bonn. Her habilitation took place in 2012 at the University of Osnabrück.

Career
From 1998 to 2000 van Aaken worked as a research assistant in the field of economic policy at the University of Fribourg, then to 2003 as a research associate at the chair of German, European and international civil and commercial law and Institutional Economics at the Humboldt University of Berlin. After that, van Aaken was a senior researcher at the Max Planck Institute of Public International Law in Heidelberg, from which she moved in 2005 to the Max Planck Institute for Research on Collective Goods in Bonn. In 2010/2011, she was also a fellow at the Institute for Advanced Study, Berlin.

From 2006 to 2012 van Aaken was the Max Schmidheiny-Stiftung Tenure track professor of law and economics, Public law, international and European law. From 2012 to 2018 she held a chair for Law and Economics, Legal Theory, International and European Law at the University of St. Gallen. In 2017, van Aaken won an Alexander von Humboldt-Professorship in Germany, at the University of Hamburg.

Van Aaken was vice-president of the European Association of Law and Economics (2009–2014) and vice-president of the European Society of International Law (2014–2017). From 2012 to 2015, she was the Chairman of the programmatic Steering Board of The Hague Institute for Internationalisation of Law. She is a member of the Scientific Advisory Board of the European Journal of International Law and a member of the editorial board of the American Journal of International Law, International Theory and the Journal of International Economic Law and co-edits the Journal of International Dispute Settlement. She is the Chair of the Research Council of the European University Institute in Florence. She has taught in Latin America, Asia, Africa, and the United States (at New York University as a Global Law Professor).

Publications
 Eine ökonomische Theorie der öffentlichen Meinung, Universitätsverlag Freiburg, Fribourg 1992. 
 "Rational choice" in der Rechtswissenschaft: zum Stellenwert der ökonomischen Theorie im Recht, Nomos, Baden-Baden 2003. 
 Deliberative institutional economics, or Does Homo oeconomicus argue?: A proposal for combining new institutional economics with discourse theory. In: Philosophy & Social Criticism (2002) 28(4), pp. 361–394.
 with Lars P. Feld and Stefan Voigt: Do Independent Prosecutors Deter Political Corruption? An Empirical Evaluation across 78 Countries. In: 12 American Law and Economics Review (2010), Heft 1, S. 204-244.
 Das deliberative Element juristischer Verfahren als Instrument zur Überwindung nachteiliger Verhaltensanomalien - Ein Plädoyer für die Einbeziehung diskursiver Elemente in die Verhaltensökonomik des Rechts. In: Christoph Engel/ Markus Englerth/ Jörn Lüdemann/ Indra Spiecker genannt Döhmann (Hrsg.) Recht und Verhalten: Beiträge zu Behavioral Law and Economics (Tübingen: Mohr Siebeck, 2007) S. 189-230.
 Fragmentation of International Law: The Case of International Investment Protection. In: Finnish Yearbook of International Law (2008) Vol. XVII, pp. 91–130
 Funktionale Rechtswissenschaftstheorie für die gesamte Rechtswissen-schaft: Eine Skizze. In: Matthias Jestaedt/ Oliver Lepsius (Hrsg.) Rechtswissen-schaftstheorie (Tübingen: Mohr Siebeck, 2008) pp. 79–104.
 Effectuating Public International Law Through Market Mechanisms?. In: Journal of Institutional and Theoretical Economics (JITE) (2009) 165(1), pp. 33–57.
 International Investment Law Between Commitment and Flexibility: A Contract Theory Analysis. In: Journal of International Economic Law (2009), 12(2), pp. 507–538
 Prudence or Discrimination? Emergency Measures, the Global Financial Crisis and International Economic Law, 12 Journal of International Economic Law (2009), Heft 4,pp. 859–894 (mit Jürgen Kurtz).
 Regulierung durch Transparenz: Verhaltensregeln für Parliamentarier und ihre Realfolgen. In: Der Staat (2010) (49)3, S. 369-404.
 Die vielen Wege zur Effektuierung des Völkerrechts. In: Rechtswissenschaft 2013, Heft 3, pp. 227–262.
 Smart Flexibility Clauses in International Investment Treaties and Sustainable Development: A Functional View. In: 15 Journal of World Investment and Trade (2014), pp. 827–861.
 Behavioral International Law and Economics. In: 55 Harvard International Law Journal (2014), pp. 421–481.
 Judge the Nudge: In Search of the Legal Limits of Paternalistic Nudging in the EU. In: Alberto Alemanno and Anne Lise Sibony (Hrsg.), Nudge and the Law. A European Perspective (Oxford: Hart Publishing, 2015), S. 83-112.
 The Diversity Challenge: Exploring the “Invisible College” of International Arbitration. In: 53 Columbia Journal of Transnational Law (2015), p. 429-506 (with Susan D. Franck, James Freda, Kellen Lavin, Tobias Lehmann).
 Constitutional Limits to Nudging: A Proportionality Assessment, in Alexandra Kemmerer, Christoph Möllers, Maximilian Steinbeis, Gerhard Wagner (eds.), Choice Architecture in Democracies: Exploring the Legitimacy of Nudging (Oxford/Baden-Baden: Hart and Nomos, 2017), pp. 199–235.
 Inside the Arbitrator's Mind, 66 Emory Law Journal (2017), pp. 1115–1173 (together with Susan D. Franck, James Freda, Jeffrey J. Racklinski, and Chris Guthrie)
 Behavioral Aspects of the International Law of Global Public Goods and Common Pool Resources, 112 (1) American Journal of International Law, 2018, pp. 67–79
 Punitive Damages in Strassburg, in: Anne van Aaken and Iulia Motoc (eds), The ECHR and General International Law (Oxford: Oxford University Press, 2018), pp. 230–250 (together with Judge Paulo Pinto de Albuquerque)

References

1969 births
20th-century German economists
21st-century German economists
University of Fribourg alumni
Jurists from North Rhine-Westphalia
German women economists
Living people
Writers from Bonn
Date of birth not in Wikidata
Academic staff of the University of Hamburg